Amamibalcis comoxensis is a species of sea snail, a marine gastropod mollusk in the family Eulimidae.

Distribution

This marine species is found in the eastern Pacific Ocean off the west coast of the United States and Canada.

References

External links
 To World Register of Marine Species

Eulimidae
Gastropods described in 1917